Camden is a community in Minneapolis, covering the upper half of the north side. Its boundaries are 53rd Avenue North to the north, the Mississippi River to the east, Lowry Avenue North to the south, and Xerxes Avenue North to the west. The community is composed of seven smaller neighborhoods. It also contains the Camden Industrial Area and the Humboldt Industrial Area, neither of which is assigned to an official neighborhood.  The Camden and Lowry Avenue bridges connect Camden to Northeast Minneapolis.

The combination of Near North and Camden is often referred to collectively as "North Minneapolis."

Official neighborhoods in the Camden community
 Cleveland
 Folwell
 Lind-Bohanon
 McKinley
 Shingle Creek
 Victory
 Webber-Camden

Demographic Characteristics

According to the 2000 Minneapolis Census provided by Hennepin County, the Camden community was home to approximately 31,250 residents. When compared with the Twin Cities Metro as a whole (87% Caucasian), ethnic diversity was well represented in the area (42% Caucasian, 34% African-American, 15% Asian, 5% Hispanic, 4% Other). Although the average Camden household income was nearly $20,000 less than the Twin Cities average ($53,144 Camden, $73,178 Twin Cities), 77% of homes in Camden were owner occupied. Only 16% of area residents held a bachelor's degree or higher (compared with Twin Cities average of 27%), and 13% lived at or below the poverty line (compared with Twin Cities average of 5%). 34% of households had children under the age of 18.

References

Communities in Minneapolis